The 1953 Utah State Aggies football team was an American football team that represented Utah State University in the Skyline Conference during the 1953 college football season. In their third season under head coach John Roning, the Aggies compiled an 8–3 record (5–2 against Skyline opponents), placed second behind rival Utah in the Skyline Conference, and outscored all opponents by a total of 207 to 139.

Offensive lineman Dave Kragthorpe receive first-team all-conference honors. (Kragthorpe later served as head coach at Oregon State from 1985 to 1990.) Earl Lindley led the NCAA with 81 points scored. He remains the only Utah State player in school history to accomplish that feat. (Lindley later played on three Grey Cup championship teams in the Canadian Football League.)

Schedule

References

Utah State
Utah State Aggies football seasons
Utah State Aggies football